The putative Wych Elm cultivar Ulmus glabra 'Corylifolia' (: Hazel-leaved) was first described by Host in Flora Austriaca (1827). Another cultivar of the same name is described by Hugo Zapalowicz in Conspectus Florae Galiciae Criticus (1908), but was assumed to be 'Cornuta'. Herbarium specimens confirm that more than one clone has been labelled 'Corylifolia', some with longish petioles and with fruit more typical of Ulmus × hollandica hybrids (see 'External links').

Description
Host described the tree as having broad-ovate scabrid leaves, doubly toothed with broad, obtuse teeth.

Pests and diseases
See under Ulmus glabra.

Cultivation
No confirmed specimens are known to survive.

Putative specimen
An elm with hazel-like leaves stands in Hove Recreation Ground, Hove, and may be similar to one of the cultivar 'Corylifolia'.

References

External links

Ulmus × hollandica specimens
 "Herbarium specimen BR0000026205052V ". Botanic Garden, Meise. Sheet labelled Umus campestris corylifolia, Liège botanical garden specimen (1903)
  Sheet labelled U. vulgaris var. corylifolia, cultivated form, Bourg-la-Reine (1935)

Ulmus glabra Huds. specimens
  Sheet labelled Ulmus campestris Linn. corylifolia (1858)
  Sheet labelled Ulmus glabra Huds. 'Corylifolia'

Wych elm cultivar
Ulmus articles missing images
Ulmus
Missing elm cultivars